The 1981 Lehigh Engineers football team was an American football team that represented Lehigh University as an independent during the 1981 NCAA Division I-AA football season.

In their sixth year under head coach John Whitehead, the Engineers compiled an 8–3 record. Joe Macellara and Larry Michalski were the team captains.

Lehigh played its home games at Taylor Stadium on the university's main campus in Bethlehem, Pennsylvania.

Schedule

References

Lehigh
Lehigh Mountain Hawks football seasons
Lehigh Engineers football